TC10/CDC42 GTPase-activating protein is an enzyme that in humans is encoded by the SNX26 gene.

This gene encodes a member of the sorting nexin family. Members of this family contain a phox (PX) domain, which is a phosphoinositide binding domain, and are involved in intracellular trafficking. The specific function of this protein has not been elucidated. Alternative splice variants have been described but their full length nature has not been determined.

References

Further reading